Pietro Ceccaroni (born 21 December 1995) is an Italian professional footballer who plays as a centre back for  club Lecce, on loan from Venezia.

Club career

Spezia
Ceccaroni is a youth exponent from Spezia Calcio. He made his debut on 1 November 2014 against Pescara in a Serie B game. He came on as a 63rd-minute substitute for Niko Datković in a 2–1 away win. 
On 5 August 2017 he scored his first goal with Spezia in the Coppa Italia match against Reggiana and it was over 3-0 for the aquilotti

Loan to Padova
On 3 July 2018, he joined Padova on a season-long loan. Padova held an option to purchase his rights at the end of the loan term.

Venezia
On 7 August 2019, he joined Venezia on loan with a purchase option. On 23 August 2020, Venezia exercised the option and Ceccaroni signed a 3-year contract with the club.

Loan to Lecce
On 31 January 2023, Ceccaroni was loaned to Lecce, with an option to buy.

References

1995 births
People from Sarzana
Sportspeople from the Province of La Spezia
Footballers from Liguria
Living people
Italian footballers
Italy youth international footballers
Association football defenders
Spezia Calcio players
S.P.A.L. players
Calcio Padova players
Venezia F.C. players
U.S. Lecce players
Serie A players
Serie B players
Serie C players